Poecilostictus is a genus of parasitoid wasps belonging to the family Ichneumonidae.

The species of this genus are found in Europe.

Species:
 Poecilostictus cothurnatus (Gravenhorst, 1829)  
 Poecilostictus decoratus Heinrich, 1974

References

Ichneumonidae
Ichneumonidae genera